The Cyclo-cross Zonhoven is a cyclo-cross race in Zonhoven, Belgium. Established in 1958, it was held in December till 1966 after which the race ceased to exist. In 2005 the event was restarted, this time in October. In the 2009–2010 season it became part of the Superprestige and was then held in February. The next season, still as a part of the Superprestige, it was held in October again. Since then it has been held either at the end of October or the beginning of November. In 2018 it's held mid-December. Since the season 2021-2022 the race is part of the UCI World Cup.

Winners

Male

Women

Notes

References

Cycle races in Belgium
Cyclo-cross races
Recurring sporting events established in 1958
1958 establishments in Belgium
Sport in Limburg (Belgium)